Pan Lon is the capital of Panlong Subtownship, Hopang District, in the Wa Self-Administered Division of Myanmar.

Geography 
The town is located west of the Salween on a high mountain valley between two ridges. The area is near the border with China, which lies at Mong Ling Shan mountain, about 11 km to the NE.

History 

Sir George Scott described the town thus:

Panglong, a Chinese Muslim town in British Burma, was entirely destroyed by the Japanese invaders in the Japanese invasion of Burma. The Hui Muslim Ma Guanggui became the leader of the Hui Panglong self defense guard created by Su who was sent by the Kuomintang government of the Republic of China to fight against the Japanese invasion of Panglong in 1942. The Japanese destroyed Panglong, burning it and driving out the over 200 Hui households out as refugees. Yunnan and Kokang received Hui refugees from Panglong driven out by the Japanese. One of Ma Guanggui's nephews was Ma Yeye, a son of Ma Guanghua and he narrated the history of Panglang included the Japanese attack. An account of the Japanese attack on the Hui in Panglong was written and published in 1998 by a Hui from Panglong called "Panglong Booklet". The Japanese attack in Burma caused the Hui Mu family to seek refuge in Panglong but they were driven out again to Yunnan from Panglong when the Japanese attacked Panglong.

Notes

References

External links 
 Deciphering Myanmar's Peace Process - Kaladan Press (Burma)
 The border area (Wa region)

Populated places in Shan State
Wa people